Louis S. Asekoff (born December 17, 1939) is an American poet and professor emeritus. Asekoff often incorporates surrealist imagery and monologue into his poetry, which is concerned with both the imagistic and aural dimensions of language. Asekoff's unconventional use of monologue as a poetic instrument is suggestive of "the inability of words to properly convey meaning" and a vehicle for implicating the readers who become "members of his poetic universe." In 2012, Poet laureate Philip Levine, who selected Asekoff for the Witter Bynner Poetry Prize, described Asekoff as "a true surreal visionary."

Asekoff taught poetry and coordinated the MFA Poetry Program at Brooklyn College for 42 years, where he also served as a Faculty Associate for The Wolfe Institute for Humanities.

Derek Mahon’s poem “The Snow Party” was dedicated to Asekoff.

Background
Asekoff was born in Waltham, Massachusetts, a small industrial city near Boston. The son of a psychiatrist, he grew up on the grounds of the psychiatric hospitals Danvers State and Metropolitan State Hospital.

Selected publications

Books
 Dreams of a Work (1994, Orchises Press)
 North Star (1997, Orchises Press)
 The Gate of Horn (2010, Triquarterly)
 Freedom Hill: a poem (2011, Triquarterly).

Selected Poems Online
 Academy of American Poets
 ColdFront Magazine
 Slate
 Boston Review
 The Cortland Review
 The New Yorker
 Poetry
 Penn Sound

Selected awards
 Guggenheim Fellowship, Poetry, 2013
 Witter Bynner Fellowship, 2012 
 Pushcart, 2011 
 NEA Literature Fellowship Recipient, 1997 
 NYFA Fellowship, Poetry, 1997 
 Jerome J. Shestack Poetry Prize, 1993
 Fund for Poetry

References

External links
Stuart A. Rose Manuscript, Archives, and Rare Book Library, Emory University: Letters to Louis Asekoff, 1963-1988

1939 births
Living people
American poets
Brooklyn College faculty